The Zündapp 9–092 or Z 92 was a German four-cylinder, air-cooled, inline aero engine made by Zündapp and used in light aircraft of the late-1930s.

Design and development
The engine was developed from the smaller Zündapp 9-090. This inverted engine featured dual gear-driven camshafts with the valve rocker cover acting as the oil tank. It featured a single Bosch magneto ignition system. A total of approximately 200 engines were produced.

Applications
Braunschweig LF-1 Zaunkönig
Bücker Bü 180
Fieseler Fi 253
Gotha Go 150
Klemm Kl 105
Möller Stürmer
Siebel Si 202

Engines on display
Preserved examples of the 9-092 engine are on public display at the Deutsches Museum, Munich and Technikmuseum Dessau.

Specifications

See also

References

Further reading
  

Air-cooled aircraft piston engines
1930s aircraft piston engines
Inverted aircraft piston engines
Zündapp